Carl Andersen (9 March 1879 in Odense – 12 September 1967 in Nykøbing Falster) was a Danish gymnast and architect.

Gymnast 
Andersen competed in the 1906 Intercalated Games and in the 1908 Summer Olympics. During the 1906 Games in Athens, he was a member of the Danish gymnastics team, which won the silver medal in the team, Swedish system event. Two years later he was part of the Danish team, which finished fourth in the team competition.

Architect 
Carl Andersen was the son of carpenter Andreas Ferdinand Andersen and Ane Marie Hansen. He became a mason apprentice in 1896 and graduated from Odense Tekniske Skole in 1900. He was employed as construction overseer by master builder Thaaning in Kerteminde in 1900-01 and as a draftsman for architect Emanuel Momberg in Odense in 1901–02. In 1904-06 he was employed by several different architects in Copenhagen including Anders Berthelsen and in 1906-09 as drawer and overseer by H.C. Glahn, Nykøbing Falster in 1906–1909. From 1909 until his death Carl Andersen operated his own architects business in Nykøbing Falster; from 1940 with his son Jørgen Friis Andersen. The business later became Arkitektfirmaet Friis Andersen A/S which still operated in the 2010s. Carl Andersen worked extensively on Lolland in the early 1900s and had many different assignments. Stylistically he worked mainly with neo-baroque but later adopted elements from Functionalism.

Selected works 
 Nykøbing Falster Post House and post masters house, Jernbanegade 50, Nykøbing Falster
 Remodeling of Nykøbing Falster School (1912)
 Public butchery, Markedsgade, Nykøbing Falster (1912)
 Gedser Church (1914–15, with Peder Vilhelm Jensen-Klint)
 Nykøbing Falster Hospital, Bispegade (1915)
 Sakskøbing police station

References

External links
 
 

1879 births
1967 deaths
Danish male artistic gymnasts
Olympic gymnasts of Denmark
Gymnasts at the 1906 Intercalated Games
Gymnasts at the 1908 Summer Olympics
Olympic silver medalists for Denmark
Danish architects
Medalists at the 1906 Intercalated Games
People from Guldborgsund Municipality
People from Odense
Sportspeople from Region Zealand